Steve Yearley  (born 6 September 1956) is a British sociologist. He is Professor of the Sociology of Scientific Knowledge at the University of Edinburgh, a post he has held since 2005. He has been designated a Fellow of the Royal Society of Edinburgh. He is currently Director of the Institute for Advanced Studies in the Humanities.

Career
Yearley was educated at Sir George Monoux Grammar School, Walthamstow, and studied natural sciences and then social and political sciences at Emmanuel College, Cambridge. He completed a PhD in sociology, supervised by Michael Mulkay, at the University of York from 1978 to 1981. H began to concentrate on environmental issues in 1983 while at Queen's University Belfast and was closely associated with Friends of the Earth, the Ulster Wildlife Trust and Northern Ireland Environment Link.

He became the first Professor of Sociology at the University of Ulster in 1992.

In 2006, Yearley became director of the Genomics Forum, a research institute funded by the ESRC. At the Forum, he focused primarily on environmental aspects, such as issues regarding synthetic biology, and on new ventures in public engagement with the science and technologies of genomics.

In 2010, Yearley was elected Fellow of the Royal Society of Edinburgh.

Yearley is on the editorial boards of the journals Social Studies of Science and Nature and Culture, and he co-edited The SAGE Dictionary of Sociology.

Books

References

1956 births
Academics of the University of Edinburgh
Alumni of Emmanuel College, Cambridge
Alumni of the University of York
British sociologists
Environmental sociologists
Fellows of the Royal Society of Edinburgh
Living people
People from Walthamstow
Sociologists of science